Saint-Basile-le-Grand is a city located in La Vallée-du-Richelieu Regional County Municipality in southwestern Quebec, Canada. The population as of the 2011 Canadian Census was 16,736.

Demographics 

Population trend:

Mother tongue language (2006)

Transportation

Saint-Basile-le-Grand is served by the Saint-Basile-le-Grand, a commuter rail station on the Exo's Mont-Saint-Hilaire line. Local bus service is provided by the Exo de la Vallée du Richelieu sector.

Education

The South Shore Protestant Regional School Board previously served the municipality.

See also
List of towns in Quebec

References

Cities and towns in Quebec
Incorporated places in La Vallée-du-Richelieu Regional County Municipality
Greater Montreal